The men's 50 kilometres race walk at the 1946 European Athletics Championships was held in Oslo, Norway, on 23 August 1946.

Medalists

Results

Final
23 August

Participation
According to an unofficial count, 8 athletes from 5 countries participated in the event.

 (1)
 (1)
 (2)
 (2)
 (2)

References

50 kilometres race walk
Racewalking at the European Athletics Championships